Helman Glacier is a small tributary glacier in the Admiralty Mountains of Antarctica, flowing southward between Mount Gleaton and Taylor Peak into Tucker Glacier. It was mapped by the United States Geological Survey from surveys and U.S. Navy air photos, 1960–64, and was named by the Advisory Committee on Antarctic Names for Terry N. Helman, U.S. Navy, a radioman at McMurdo Station, 1967.

References

Glaciers of Victoria Land
Borchgrevink Coast